The 2011–12 HockeyAllsvenskan season was the 7th season of HockeyAllsvenskan. The regular season started on 17 September 2011 and ended on 2 March 2012. The following Playoff round for the final spot in the 2012 Kvalserien started on 4 March and ended on 12 March 2012.

Participating teams

Standings

Playoff round
In the Playoff round, each team played a round-robin, facing each team twice – once at home and once on the road, giving a total of six games per team. The 4th seed from the regular season was awarded four extra points, the 5th seed three points, the 6th seed two points, and the 7th seed got one point. Rögle BK finished first and got the final spot in the 2012 Kvalserien qualification tournament for Elitserien.

Game log

|-
| rowspan="2" | 1 || rowspan="2" | March 4 || Malmö Redhawks || 3–5 || VIK Västerås HK || Malmö Arena || 4,259
|-
| IK Oskarshamn || 2–3 OT || Rögle BK || Arena Oskarshamn || 2,565
|-
| rowspan="2" | 2 || rowspan="2" | March 6 || VIK Västerås HK || 2–3 || IK Oskarshamn || ABB Arena || 2,202
|-
| Rögle BK || 1–3 || Malmö Redhawks || Lindab Arena || 4,393
|-
| rowspan="2" | 3 || rowspan="2" | March 7 || Rögle BK || 4–1 || VIK Västerås HK || Lindab Arena || 2,444
|-
| IK Oskarshamn || 2–4 || Malmö Redhawks || Arena Oskarshamn || 2,728
|-
| rowspan="2" | 4 || rowspan="2" | March 9 || VIK Västerås HK || 3–4 SO || Rögle BK || ABB Arena || 1,713
|-
| Malmö Redhawks || 0–1 || IK Oskarshamn || Malmö Arena || 5,908
|-
| rowspan="2" | 5 || rowspan="2" | March 11 || IK Oskarshamn || 3–1 || VIK Västerås HK || Arena Oskarshamn || 2,713
|-
| Malmö Redhawks || 5–3 || Rögle BK || Malmö Arena || 8,635
|-
| rowspan="2" | 6 || rowspan="2" | March 12 || VIK Västerås HK || 1–4 || Malmö Redhawks || ABB Arena || 728
|-
| Rögle BK || 7–0 || IK Oskarshamn || Lindab Arena || 3,198
|-

Relegation round

References

External links

 
HockeyAllsvenskan seasons
2011–12 in Swedish ice hockey leagues
Swe